Schildts & Söderströms is a Finnish book publisher, which was established in February 2012 through a merger between Schildts Förlags Ab and Söderström & Co.

The publisher is based in Helsinki. Its first managing director was  until February 2014. She was succeeded by Mari Koli.

The company has three imprints: S&S Litteratur, its Swedish-language publisher; S&S Läromedel, the largest publisher of Swedish-language teaching materials in Finland; and Kustantamo S&S, the largest publisher of Finland Swedish translations in Finnish. It publishes approximately 40 titles a year in a variety of genres, including children's literature, novels, and nonfiction.

Authors 
Schildts & Söderströms has published books by Finnish-Swedish authors such as:

 Claes Andersson
 
 
 Bo Carpelan
 Claes Andersson
 Jörn Donner
 
 
 Monika Fagerholm
 Tua Forsström
 
 Lars Huldén
 
 Zinaida Lindén
 Ulla-Lena Lundberg
 Merete Mazzarella
 Henrik Meinander
 Camilla Mickwitz
 
 Ulf Stark
 
 Henrik Tikkanen
 Märta Tikkanen
 
 Maria Turtschaninoff
 Kjell Westö
 Gösta Ågren

References

External links 
 Schildts & Söderströms' website
 Schildts & Söderströms in Uppslagsverket Finland (online edition, 2012). CC-BY-SA 4.0

Finnish companies established in 2012
Book publishing companies of Finland